This list of 2020 motorsport champions is a list of national or international motorsport series with championships decided by the points or positions earned by a driver from multiple races where the season was completed during the 2020 calendar year.

The COVID-19 pandemic caused disruption to motorsport across the world during the year, resulting in mass changes across most championships, and some even being outright cancelled.

Drag racing

Motorcycle racing

Dirt racing

Open wheel racing

Rallying

Rally Raid

Rallycross

Sports car and GT

Stock car racing

Touring cars

Truck racing

See also
 List of motorsport championships

References

Champions
2020